Luisa Ferrer (born 4 January 1962) is a Cuban female former track and field athlete. She competed in several notable competitive events during her career including the Central American and Caribbean Championships in Athletics, Central American and Caribbean Games, Pan American Games and Ibero-American Championships.

Career 
She rose to prominence in Athletics after claiming a silver medal in the women's 100m and a bronze medal in the 200m track events during the 1981 Central American and Caribbean Championships in Athletics.

Luisa Ferrer also claimed two gold medals in the women's 100m, 200m events and a bronze medal in the women's 4×100m relay event at the 1982 Central American and Caribbean Games, the event which was held in Cuba.

References

External links 

 

1962 births
Living people
Cuban female sprinters
Cuban female athletes
Pan American Games bronze medalists for Cuba
Pan American Games medalists in athletics (track and field)
Athletes (track and field) at the 1983 Pan American Games
Central American and Caribbean Games gold medalists for Cuba
Competitors at the 1982 Central American and Caribbean Games
Competitors at the 1986 Central American and Caribbean Games
Central American and Caribbean Games medalists in athletics
Medalists at the 1983 Pan American Games
20th-century Cuban women
20th-century Cuban people